Cluny Women's College, established in 1998, is a general degree women's college in Kalimpong in the Kalimpong district of Indian state of West Bengal. It offers undergraduate courses in arts. It is affiliated to University of North Bengal.

Departments

Arts

Nepali
English
Hindi
History
Geography
Sociology

See also

References

External links
Cluny Women’s College 
University of North Bengal
University Grants Commission
National Assessment and Accreditation Council

Women's universities and colleges in West Bengal
Universities and colleges in Kalimpong district
Colleges affiliated to University of North Bengal
Kalimpong
Educational institutions established in 1998
1998 establishments in West Bengal